Le Loroux-Bottereau is a commune in the Loire-Atlantique department in western France.

Population

References

See also
Communes of the Loire-Atlantique department
Jean Fréour, sculptor

Communes of Loire-Atlantique